The swimming competition at the 1955 Mediterranean Games was held in Barcelona, Spain.

Medallists

Men's events

Medal table

References
Complete 1955 Mediterranean Games report released by the International Mediterranean Games Committee

Mediterranean Games
Sports at the 1955 Mediterranean Games
1955